Sandy Secondary School (formerly Sandy Upper School) is a coeducational secondary school, located in Sandy, Bedfordshire, England.

The school educates 11-16 year-olds, mainly from the town of Sandy, Great Barford, Potton and the surrounding villages. In addition, the school offers further education for 16–18 year-olds through its sixth form department.

Sandy Secondary  School was designated as a Sports College in 2003. As a result of this, the school improved its sporting facilities and hired specialized and dedicated sports teaching staff.

The school received an 'Inadequate' inspection rating from Ofsted at the start of 2013 where the school was subsequently put in special measures, but haven't received an inadequate rating since. In January 2013 the Governing Body of Sandy Secondary School voted not to enter into advanced negotiations with the Barnfield Federation, with the intention of Sandy Secondary School becoming a sponsored academy. Preparations for the academy conversion were controversial with pupils and students including a requirement for year 10 students to drop one of their GCSE courses. The move to academy status was cancelled after financial irregularities were uncovered at the Barnfield Federation.

Previously an upper school educating pupils from the age of 13, in September 2018 Sandy became a secondary school educating pupils from the age of 11.

References

External links
 Sandy Secondary School homepage

Secondary schools in Central Bedfordshire District
Foundation schools in Central Bedfordshire District
Sandy, Bedfordshire